Martinho Lutero Galati de Oliveira (29 September 1953 – 25 March 2020) was a Brazilian conductor, born in Alpercata. He died in São Paulo in March 2020 after suffering from COVID-19.

Galati wrote the book Do gesture à gestão: um diálogo sobre maestros e liderança. He was director of the Coral Paulistano do Theatro Municipal de São Paulo from 2013 to 2016. He was elected president of the Associação Brasileira de Regentes Corais in 2018. He was a professor at the Free University of Languages and Communication and at the Institute of Musicology of Milan.

References

1953 births
2020 deaths
Brazilian conductors (music)
Deaths from the COVID-19 pandemic in São Paulo (state)
Musicians from Minas Gerais
20th-century conductors (music)
20th-century Brazilian musicians
20th-century male musicians
21st-century conductors (music)
21st-century Brazilian musicians
21st-century male musicians